Dentalium is a large genus of  tooth shells or tusk shells, marine scaphopod molluscs in the family Dentaliidae. The genus contains 50 described species and about 50 extinct species.

Etymology
The scientific name of this genus comes from the Latin word dentis, meaning tooth, based on the tooth or tusk-shaped form of these molluscs.

Description
The mantle of Dentalium species is entirely within the shell. The foot extends from the larger end of the shell, and is used to burrow through the substrate. They position their head down in the substrate, with the apical end of the shell (at the rear of the animal's body) projecting up into the water. These molluscs live on seafloor sediment, feeding on microscopic organisms, detritus and foraminiferans.

The shells are conical and curved in a planispiral way, and they are usually whitish in color. Because of these characteristics, the shell somewhat resembles a miniature elephant's tusk. They are hollow and open at both ends; the opening at the larger end is the main or anterior aperture of the shell. The smaller opening is known as the apical aperture.

Human use

South Asia
At Mehrgarh, a village located at the foot of the Bolan Pass in Balochistan in modern-day Pakistan, ornaments made of Dentalium shell have been found at burial sites dating back to 6000 BCE.

Excavations conducted by Jean-François Jarrige have described 'Exceptional grave deposits of Dentalium headbands found on the heads of several females...In Burial 274, the headband was made of woven rows of small dentalium and closed by two straps used as a clasp'.

Native Americans
The shells of Dentalium neohexagonum have been used by Indigenous people of the Pacific Northwest and West Coast as a form of status and currency since time immemorial. The Chumash people have also been reported using dentalium as early as circa 1000 AD, in the Morro Bay area.

New Zealand

Māori traditionally used Dentalium shells for decorative purposes, such as rings and necklaces. Most artefacts have been found around the Coromandel Peninsula, and typically earlier artefacts during the Archaic Period (1300–1500) are Dentalium solidum, while later shells are Dentalium nanum.

18th-century European use
In pre-modern medicine, these shells were considered an excellent alkali, and apothecaries would pulverize them for use in several preparations. The shell used for this purpose was described by Joseph Pitton de Tournefort in London in the 18th century as being "of a tubular, or conical form, about 3 inches long; of a shining, greenish white; hollow; light, and divided lengthwise by parallel lines, running from top to bottom. It is about the thickness of a feather, and bears some resemblance to a canine tooth." However, it was considered at that time to be very rare, and in lieu of that, another shell was usually substituted. This was described as a multi-colored shell found in the sand where the tide had fallen; this shell was not channeled, or fluted. The large green shell to which the writer first refers must have been either Dentalium elephantinum or Dentalium aprinum, both of which are large and greenish, and live in the Indo-Pacific zone. The other shell was presumably another species, possibly Dentalium entale, which is native to Great Britain.

Species
Species within the genus Dentalium include:

 Dentalium aciculum Gould, 1859
 Dentalium adenense Ludbrook, 1954
 Dentalium agassizi Pilsbry and Sharp, 1897 Stained tuskshell
 Dentalium americanum Chenu, 1843 American tuskshell
 Dentalium antillarum D'Orbigny, 1842
 Dentalium aprinum Linnaeus, 1766 
 Dentalium bartletti Henderson, 1920
 Dentalium calamus Dall, 1889
 Dentalium callipeplum Dall, 1889
 Dentalium callithrix Dall, 1889
 Dentalium carduum Dall, 1889
 Dentalium ceratum (Dall, 1881)
 Dentalium circumcinctum Watson, 1879
 Dentalium cheverti Sharp & Pilsbry, 1897
 Dentalium clavus A. H. Cooke, 1885
 Dentalium collinsae Lamprell & Healy, 1998
 Dentalium congoense Plate, 1908
 Dentalium cookei Sharp & Pilsbry, 1897
 Dentalium crosnieri Scarabino, 1995
 Dentalium curtum G. B. Sowerby II, 1860
 Dentalium dalli Pilsbry and Sharp, 1897
 Dentalium debitusae Scarabino, 2008
 Dentalium dentale Linnaeus, 1766 European tusk 
 Dentalium didymum Watson, 1879
 Dentalium eboreum Conrad, 1846 Ivory tusk 
 Dentalium ecostatum T W Kirk, 1880
 Dentalium elephantinum Linnaeus, 1758 - Elephant tusk 
 Dentalium ensiculus Jeffereys, 1877
 Dentalium entale entale (Linnaeus, 1758)
 Dentalium entale stimpsoni (Henderson, 1920)
 Dentalium entale Linnaeus, 1758
 Dentalium floridense J. B. Henderson, 1920
 Dentalium formosum Adams & Reeve, 1850 Formosan tusk
 Dentalium glaucarena Dell, 1953
 Dentalium gouldii Dall, 1889 Gould tuskshell
 Dentalium grahami Lamprell & Healy, 1998
 Dentalium healyi Steiner & Kabat, 2004
 Dentalium hedleyi Lamprell & Healy, 1998
 Dentalium hillae Lamprell & Healy, 1998
 Dentalium humboldti Sahlmann & van der Beek, 2016
 Dentalium inversum Deshayes, 1825
 Dentalium laqueatum A. E. Verrill, 1885 Reticulate tuskshell
 Dentalium liodon Pilsbry and Sharp, 1897
 Dentalium longitrorsum Reeve, 1842 Elongate tusk 
 Dentalium magellanicum Pilsbry & Sharp, 1897
 Dentalium majorinum Mabille & Rochebrune, 1889
 Dentalium malekulaense Scarabino, 2008
 Dentalium meridionale Pilsbry and Sharp, 1897
 Dentalium nanum Hutton, 1873
 Dentalium neohexagonum Sharp and Pilsbry, 1897 Hexagon tuskshell
 Dentalium occidentale Stimpson, 1851
 Dentalium octangulatum  Donovan, 1804 Octagonal tusk 
 Dentalium oerstedii Mörch, 1861
 Dentalium ophiodon Dall, 1881
 Dentalium oryx Boissevain, 1906
 Dentalium perlongum Dall, 1881
 Dentalium peitaihoense S. G. King & Ping, 1935
 Dentalium pilsbryi Rehder, 1942
 Dentalium pluricostatum Boissevain, 1906
 Dentalium poindimiense Scarabino, 2008
 Dentalium potteri Lamprell & Healy, 1998
 Dentalium pretiosum Sowerby, 1860 Indian-money tusk 
 Dentalium rebeccaense Henderson, 1920
 Dentalium rectius Carpenter, 1864
 Dentalium semistriolatum Guilding, 1834 Half-scratched tusk
 Dentalium senegalense Dautzenberg, 1891 Senegal tusk 
 Dentalium sowerbyi Guilding, 1834
 Dentalium stenochizum Pilsbry and Sharp, 1897
 Dentalium strigatum Gould, 1859
 Dentalium stumkatae Lamprell & Healy, 1998
 Dentalium suteri Emerson, 1954
 Dentalium taphrium Dall, 1889
 Dentalium texasianum Philippi, 1848
 Dentalium tiwhana Dell, 1953
 Dentalium tubulatum Henderson, 1920
 Dentalium vallicolens Raymond, 1904 Trench tuskshell
 Dentalium vernedei Sowerby, 1860l Vernede's tusk 
 Dentalium vitreum Sars, 1851
 Dentalium vulgare da Costa, 1778 Common tusk 
 Dentalium zelandicum Sowerby, 1860 New Zealand tusk 

Species brought into synonymy
 Dentalium diarrhox Watson, 1879: synonym of Antalis diarrhox (R. B. Watson, 1879)

Extinct species
Extinct species within the genus Dentalium include:

 †Dentalium akasakensis  Hayasaka 1925
 †Dentalium alazanum  Cooke 1928
 †Dentalium angsananum  Martin 1922
 †Dentalium aratum  Tate 1887
 †Dentalium arcotinum  Forbes 1846
 †Dentalium atratum  Tate 1887
 †Dentalium attenuatum  Say 1824
 †Dentalium badense  Partsch, 1856
 †Dentalium bifrons  Tate 1887
 †Dentalium bocasense  Olsson 1922
 †Dentalium caduloide  Dall 1892
 †Dentalium cannaliculatum  Klipstein 1843
 †Dentalium cossmannianum  Pilsbry and Sharp 1897
 †Dentalium danai  Meyer 1885
 †Dentalium decoratum  Münster 1841
 †Dentalium denotatum  Ludbrook 1956
 †Dentalium giganteum  Sowerby 1846
 †Dentalium gonatodes  Martin 1885
 †Dentalium hamatum  Forbes 1846
 †Dentalium hanguense  Cox 1930
 †Dentalium hecetaensis  Rohr et al. 2006
 †Dentalium inaequale  Bronn 1831
 †Dentalium indianum  Girty 1911
 †Dentalium junghuhni  Martin 1879
 †Dentalium kansasense  Gentile 1974
 †Dentalium klipsteini  Kittl 1891
 †Dentalium latisulcatum  Tate 1899
 †Dentalium lombardicum  Kittl 1899
 †Dentalium mancorens  Olsson 1930
 †Dentalium microstria  Heilprin 1880
 †Dentalium montense  Briart and Cornet 1889
 †Dentalium moreanum  d'Orbigny 1845
 †Dentalium neohexagonum  Sharp and Pilsbry 1897
 †Dentalium neornatum  Hayasaka 1925
 †Dentalium ovale  Cooke 1928
 †Dentalium pseudonyma  Pilsbry and Sharp 1898
 †Dentalium rimosum  Bose 1906
 †Dentalium rugiferum von Koenen 1885
 †Dentalium sandbergeri  Cossmann and Lambert 1884
 †Dentalium schencki  Moore 1963
 †Dentalium sexangulum  (Gmelin, 1790) 
 †Dentalium simile  Münster 1841
 †Dentalium solidum  Hutton 1873
 †Dentalium sorbii  King 1850
 †Dentalium speyeri  Geinitz 1852
 †Dentalium sundkrogensis  Schnetler 2001
 †Dentalium tenuistriatum  Martin 1879
 †Dentalium tornatissimum  Tate 1899
 †Dentalium triquetrum  Tate 1887
 †Dentalium yasilum  Olsson 1930

Fossils in the genus Dentalium are geographically widespread. This genus is very ancient, going back up to the Silurian period (age range: from 422.9 to 0.0 million years ago). It is especially represented in Cretaceous, Eocene and Miocene fossils.

Gallery

References

 Habe, T. (1963). A classification of the scaphopod mollusks found in Japan and adjacent areas. Bulletin of the National Science Museum Tokyo. 6(3): 252–281, pls 37–38.
 Scarabino V., 1995 Scaphopoda of the tropical Pacific and Indian Oceans, with description of 3 new genera and 42 new species P. Bouchet (ed) Résultats des Campagnes MUSORSTOM, Volume 14 Mémoires du Muséum National d'Histoire Naturelle, 167 189-379
 Gofas, S.; Le Renard, J.; Bouchet, P. (2001). Mollusca. in: Costello, M.J. et al. (eds), European Register of Marine Species: a check-list of the marine species in Europe and a bibliography of guides to their identification. Patrimoines Naturels. 50: 180-213

External links
 Linnaeus, C. (1758). Systema Naturae per regna tria naturae, secundum classes, ordines, genera, species, cum characteribus, differentiis, synonymis, locis. Editio decima, reformata [10th revised edition], vol. 1: 824 pp. Laurentius Salvius: Holmiae
 https://web.archive.org/web/20070811162831/http://www.mnhn.fr/publication/zoosyst/z01n3a4.pdf

Dentaliidae
Extant Silurian first appearances
Paleozoic life of Ontario